Gomphotheres are any members of the diverse, extinct taxonomic family Gomphotheriidae. Gomphotheres were elephant-like proboscideans, but do not belong to the family Elephantidae. They were widespread across Afro-Eurasia and North America during the Miocene and Pliocene epochs and dispersed into South America during the Pleistocene following the Great American Interchange. Gomphotheriidae in its broadest sense is probably paraphyletic with respect to Elephantidae, which contains modern elephants, as well as Stegodontidae. While most famous forms such as Gomphotherium had long lower jaws with tusks, which is the ancestral condition for the group, some members developed shortened (brevirostrine) lower jaws with either vestigial or no lower tusks, looking very similar to modern elephants, an example of parallel evolution, which outlasted the long-jawed gomphotheres. By the end of the Early Pleistocene, gomphotheres became extinct in Afro-Eurasia, with the last two genera, Cuvieronius persisting in southern North and Central America and Notiomastodon having a wide range over most of South America until the end of the Pleistocene around 12,000 years ago, when they became extinct following the arrival of humans.

The name "gomphothere" comes from Ancient Greek , "peg, pin; wedge; joint" plus , "beast".

Evolutionary history 
The relationships of gomphotheres to other proboscideans remain unclear, and to some extent the grouping is a wastebasket taxon to refer to proboscideans that cannot be assigned to other groups. Gomphotheres originated in Africa during the Miocene, and arrived in Eurasia after the connection of Africa and Eurasia during the Early Miocene around 19 million years ago, in what is termed the "Proboscidean Datum Event". Gomphotherium arrived in North America around 16 million years ago. Notiomastodon and Cuvieronius dispersed into South America after 2 million years ago as part of the Great American Biotic Interchange due to the formation of the Isthmus of Panama. The last known gomphothere native to Eurasia was Sinomastodon, which became extinct at the end of the Early Pleistocene.

Description
Gomphotheres differed from elephants in their tooth structure, particularly the chewing surfaces on the molar teeth. The earlier species had four tusks, and their retracted facial and nasal bones prompted paleontologists to believe that gomphotheres had elephant-like trunks.

Taxonomy 
Both the genus Gomphotherium and family Gomphotheriidae were erected by the German zoologist Karl Hermann Konrad Burmeister (1807-1892) in 1837.

The term gomphothere as historically used (sensu lato) is paraphyletic, containing all proboscideans more derived than mammutids, but less derived than elephantids. The term gomphothere sensu stricto refers specifically to trilophodont gomphotheres. The genera Anancus, Morrillia, Paratetralophodon, and Tetralophodon, but also the families Choerolophodontidae and Amebelodontidae, were formerly classified as gomphotheres sensu lato. Tetralophodont gompotheres are more closely related to the Elephantidae and amebelodonts and choerolophodonts more primitive than trilophodont gomphotheres. In 2019, a study using collagen sequencing found Notiomastodon to form a clade with the American mastodon, rather than closer to the Elephantidae, as had previously been supposed. The idea that the Mammutidae and Gomphotheriidae are closely related was supported by a morphological study in 2020, which noted the similarity of the molars of the newly resurrected mammutid genus Miomastodon and those of Gomphotherium subtapiroideum/tassyi. However this was contradicted by a 2021 study using Mitochondrial DNA from Notiomastodon, which again found a closer relationship with elephants. Phylogeny of trilophodont gomphotheres according to Mothé et al., 2016:

Diet 
Isotopic analyses of South American gomphotheres suggest a wide diet for Notiomastodon platensis, except for the fossils unearthed at the localities in Santiago del Estero and La Carolina in Ecuador. Isotope analyses suggested an exclusive C4 diet, whereas every other South American locality indicates an exclusive C3 or mixed C3 and C4 diets. The results also support the latitudinal gradient of C3 and C4 grasses. The stereomicrowear analyses for N. platensis exhibited average scratch and pit values, which place it within the extant mixed-feeder morphospace and the higher frequency of fine scratches indicated the ingestion of C3 grasses.

Alternatively, the presence of coarse and hypercoarse scratches along with gouges and large pits suggests the ingestion of foliage and lignified portions. The plant microfossil analysis recovered fragments of conifer tracheid and vessel elements with a ray of parenchyma cells, which corroborates the consumption of woody plants, pollen grains, spores, and fibers.

The Aguas de Araxa gomphotheres were generalist feeders and consumed wood elements, leaves, and C3 grasses. Cuvieronius specimens from Chile were exclusively C3 plant eaters, whereas specimens from Bolivia and Ecuador are classified as having a mixed C3 and C4 diet. Notiomastodon showed a wider range of dietary adaptations. Specimens from Quequen Salado in Buenos Aires Province were entirely C3 feeders, whereas the diet of specimens from La Carolina Peninsula in Ecuador was exclusively C4.

Possible causes for extinction 
The results confirm that ancient diets cannot always be interpreted solely from dental morphology or extrapolated from present relatives. The data from Middle and Late Pleistocene periods indicate that over time,  a shift occurred in dietary patterns away from predominantly mixed feeders to more specialized feeders. This dietary evolution may have been one of the factors that contributed to the disappearance of South American gomphotheres at the end of the Pleistocene. Climatic change and human predation have also been discussed as possible causes of extinction.

Associations with early human sites
Gomphothere remains are common at South American Paleo-Indian sites. Examples include the early human settlement at Monte Verde, Chile, dating to around 14,000 years ago, and the Altiplano Cundiboyacense (Tibitó, 11,740  years ago), and the Valle del Magdalena of Colombia. In 2011, remains dating between 10,600 and 11,600 years ago were also found in the El Fin del Mundo (End of the World) site in Sonora, Mexico's Clovis location – the first time such an association was found in a northern part of the continent where gomphotheres had been thought to have gone extinct 30,000 years ago. As announced in July 2014, the "position and proximity of Clovis weapon fragments relative to the gomphothere bones at the site suggest that humans did in fact kill the two animals there. Of the seven Clovis points found at the site, four were in place among the bones, including one with bone and teeth fragments above and below. The other three points had clearly eroded away from the bone bed and were found scattered nearby."

Gallery

References

External links
  (article about a fossil exhibit at the Sierra College Natural History Museum)
 
  (photos from the excavation of a Gomphothere skeleton on the Sierra College website)
 

 
Miocene proboscideans
Pliocene proboscideans
Serravallian first appearances
Holocene extinctions
Pleistocene proboscideans
Taxa named by Ángel Cabrera

de:Gomphotherium